Naomi D. Jakobsson (born September 28, 1941) was a Democratic member of the Illinois House of Representatives, who represented the 103rd District from 2003 to 2015. The 103rd District encompasses Urbana, and Champaign.

Early life, education and career
Jakobsson earned her bachelor's degree from the University of Illinois at Urbana-Champaign in 1977 and went on to earn her master's degree in Teaching English as a Second Language in December 1979 from the same institution. From 1979 to 1984 she worked as an English as a Second Language teacher for the Urbana School District.

Jakobsson began her public career in 1984, when she was elected Champaign County Recorder of Deeds. She would serve as Champaign County Recorder of Deeds from 1984 to 1996. From 1996 to 1998 she served as the executive director of A Woman's Fund, a domestic violence shelter, and from 1999 to 2002 she worked for the University YMCA and the University YWCA first as development officer and then as executive director. As of 2002 Jakobsson served on the board of the Illinois Children's Home and Aid Society, as the Urbana Human Relations Commissioner, and on the board of the Champaign County Habitat for Humanity.

Illinois General Assembly
Naomi was elected to represent the 103rd District in 2002. Jakobsson chaired the House Human Services Committee. Additionally, she served on the House Committees for Higher Education, Adoption Reform, Appropriations - Elementary and Secondary Education, and Appropriations - Higher Education. As a legislator Naomi has been active in sponsoring and supporting legislation that concerns the University of Illinois, the environment, and women's health.  She voted against HB 148.

Personal life
Naomi is married and is the mother of eight children, two by birth and six by adoption. Her son, Garret, died due to frontotemporal dementia, a neurodegenerative disease, in 2013 aged 46. Jakobsson had been at vigil by his bedside when she received word that a poll of members of the Illinois House showed that she was needed to cast the decisive vote in Springfield on the marriage equality bill she had co-sponsored. Her husband drove her to Springfield to cast that vote. During her drive to Springfield one member shifted his position, so the measure actually passed by two votes. Garret died approximately fifteen minutes before her return to him.

References

External links
Representative Naomi D. Jakobsson (D) 103rd District at the Illinois General Assembly
By session: 98th, 97th, 96th, 95th, 94th, 93rd
Naomi Jakobsson for State Representative
 
Naomi D. Jakobsson at Illinois House Democrats

Democratic Party members of the Illinois House of Representatives
1941 births
Living people
Politicians from Somerville, New Jersey
Women state legislators in Illinois
University of Illinois Urbana-Champaign alumni
American Presbyterians
21st-century American politicians
21st-century American women politicians
County officials in Illinois